Keramat Moula (born November 15, 1942) is a Bangladeshi theater activist and art director. He was awarded Ekushey Padak in 2014 by the Government of Bangladesh.

Background
Moula was born on November 15, 1942, in Jessore District to Abdul Kader and Kaniz Fatema. He is the sixth of his parents' seven children. He married Nazma Begum. He was the first art director of Bangladesh Television in 1965. His first acting on BTV was in the play, "Ondhokartai Alo" by Natyaguru Nurul Momen.

Career
Moula was a student of Zainul Abedin and Mustafa Monwar when he was a student at the department of Drawing and Painting of Dhaka Art College (later Faculty of Fine Arts, University of Dhaka).

He is a part-time lecturer at the Television, Film and Media Department of Stamford University Bangladesh.

Awards
 East Pakistan Education Award in drama (1961)
 "Best Actor" at  the 2nd International Theatre Festival
 "Best Art Direction" at the 1st National Television Award (1975)
 "Best Actor" at the Shilpakala Academy Award (1978)
 Utpal Datta Shammanona (2006)
 Ekushey Padak (2014)

References

Living people
1942 births
People from Jessore District
Recipients of the Ekushey Padak in arts
Bangladeshi male stage actors
University of Dhaka Faculty of Fine Arts alumni